Lori is a historical geographical region of Armenia.  In ancient times and the Middle Ages, it was also known as Tashir or Tashirk. After the construction of Lori Fortress by King David I Anhoghin, the region was also referred to as Lori. The toponym's etymology is from the Armenian word , meaning 'quail'.

Geography and toponymy
The earliest name is Tashir or Tashirk. Pliny refers to the form Thasie. The Georgians also called the place Somkhiti, i.e. Armenia, along with the other nearest regions. The central part of the region was also referred to as Tashirapat, which is rendered as Tashir Valley from Old Armenian (currently Lori Plateau). The name Lori derives from Old Armenian , i.e. 'quail'. Until the 7th century, its center was Odzun; later, Lori (Lore) or Loriberd became the central cities.

History

Ancient Times
In the historical memory of the Armenians, all the regions in the province of Gugark (including Tashir) were governed by the descendants of Gushar, the offspring of Hayk, the legendary patriarch of the Armenian nation.

According to Constantine Tumanov, the region of Tashir was seized from Armenia in the wake of the Pharnavazids' expansion. That opinion was shared by Robert H. Hewsen. After coming into possession of the Armenian regions of Tashir, as well as Ashotsi, the Pharnavazids united them into the Duchy of Samshwild. In the 2nd century B.C., the re-established Armenian monarchy returned Tashir to Armenia. The Artaxiad dynasty, in turn, created a separate administrative unit including Tashir.

In the first half of the 1st century (the period of the fall of the statehood), Iberia established control over Tashir. At the close of the same century, however, the re-established Armenian statehood (ruled by the Artaxiads) managed to return the region. After the division of Armenia in 387, Tashir (the upper parts excluded) passed under Iberia's control. The princes of Tashir represented those dynasties of Armenia which existed both under the Artaxiads and in the later epochs. Ghazar Parpetsi and Elishe refer to the princes of Tashir as participants of the rebellion against the Sassanids between 450 and 451 (formerly part of Gugark Bdeshxhood). By the mid-5th century, Tashir became a separate kingdom. By the end of the 7th century, it restored the one-time bdeshxhood borders.

Middle Ages

In the 9th century, Prince Guaram conquered Tashir. Available records reveal that neither his father, Ashot, nor grandfather, exercised control over the region. Until 876, Guaram handed over the adjacent region of Ashotsk to his son-in-law Ashot, the future king of Armenia. It was apparently in that period that Tashir was handed over as the name never occurs among the lands under the Bagratids' possession. However, it was later referred to as a land controlled by their Armenian kinsmen.

In about 908 A.D., King Ashot III's son, Kurike, gained control over northern Tashir, which had a formed state in vassal dependence upon Ani. Lori, otherwise known as Tashir-Dzoraget, reached its heyday under David I Anhoghin. Arp Aslan's invasion in 1064 had its reflection also on that state's historic future. King Kurike II of Lori was forced to recognize the sovereignty of Arp Aslan. At the time, King Bagrat IV of Georgia seized Samshvilde from Kurike II, and the latter had to move the capital to the south, i.e. the fort city of Lori founded earlier by his father. In 1105, Lori was invaded by Emir Kyzyl.  The Kingdom of Lori finally fell in 1113. The British Encyclopedia and The Cambridge History of Iran refer to the Kingdom of Lori as one of the last hotbeds of the Armenian statehood after the country's Seljuk invasion in the 11th century.

In the period between 1110 and 1123, King David the Builder united several Armenian lands – including Lori – to Georgia. A Georgian chronicler left records about David's invasions: "... The same year he conquered the Armenian fortress of Lore". According to Vardan the Great, the latter united "Gag, Terunakat, Tavush, Kayan, Kaytson, Lore, Tashchir and Makhanaberd, subjecting all the Armenian possessions to his rule". Afterwards, the Georgian king also held the title of the King of Armenians. Lori was soon handed over to the Orbeli family. Shortly after the suppression of the Orbeli uprising (1177), King George III handed over Lori to the Khubasar, the Kipchak ruler. Eight years later, however, Queen Tamar handed over the region to Sargis Mkhragrdzeli-Zavaryan, the new amirspasalar (commander-in-chief) of Georgia. According to Cyril Toumanoff, Lori was ruled by the Kingdom of Zakaryans (Mkhragrdzeli) between the 12th and 13th centuries. North-Eastern Armenia, which was under Georgian reign, was ruled by Amirspasalar Zakare and his son, Shahinshah, in the 13th century. The entire north of Armenia was liberated from the Seljuks, with the reign extending to vaster areas. Also in the same period, the small region of Dsegh appeared briefly under Mamikonian rule. From 1236 until 1237, Lori, along with other major cities of Armenia, was captured by the Mongols. Ahead of the Mongol conquest, it was one of the main centers of crafts and trade in Northern Armenia. The fortified city fell under the rule of Qarachar Noyan. In the late 14th century, Lori was destroyed by Tamerlan. Lori was among those regions of historic Armenia that suffered the most severe consequences of the Timur invasion as part of the Georgian Kingdom. In 1435, Georgian King Alexander I handed over the region to the Orbelian Dynasty. Between 1474 and 1477, traveler Ambrogio Contarini wrote the following record about Lori:

Modern and contemporary times
From the 16th until the 17th centuries, the mountainous regions of Lori were ruled by Armenian melik-feudals. Thus, in the 16th century, the ruler of Lori was Melik-Nazar who, in 1602, received a royal edict from King Abbas the Great of Persia, affirming his long-time rights to rule over the region. 
 
After the 1555 Peace of Amasya, Lori passed under the Safavids' control, administratively being integrated into the Kingdom of Kartli-Kakheti. When Abbas the Great displaced an estimated 250,000 people from Eastern Armenia during the 1604 "Great Sürgün", the population of Lori was also deported. A contemporary of the events, Arakel of Tabriz, left the following record in the mid-17th century:

After 1747, Kakheti, as well as Kartli, seceded from Iran. From 1762 onwards, Lori formed part of the Georgian Kingdom united by Herculius II.

In 1771, traveler Johann Anton Güldenstädt wrote:

In 1801, it united with Russia (along with Georgia), forming the Dynasty of Lori-Pambak. According to Giovanni Guaita: "Russia thus receives part of the territory of ancient Armenia, i.e. Lori and Dilijan along with Artsakh".

Culture

Two mountain vishapakars have been preserved in Lori.

The region was a center of Armenian monastic life. In the early 5th century, Mesrop Mashtots visited Tashir.  According to S. Peter Cowe, he sought to spread literacy among the Armenian population in an effort to preserve their authenticity after the region was captured from Armenia.

Among the medieval monasteries, there are such famous landmarks as Odzun, the Holy Mother of God Church of Kurtan, Tormak in Gulagarak, Jrashen in Vardablur and Bardzrakadh in Dsegh. The 6th-century basilica of Odzun is of a special cultural value. In the 10th century, the monasteries of Sanahin and Haghpat, major historical monuments of Armenia, were built in the east of the Tashir-Dzorakert Kingdom. Lori was home to such representatives of the Armenian culture as Hovhannes Sarkavag, Grigor Tuteordi, David Kobayretsi, Anania Sanahentsi, etc.

In the first decades of the 13th century North-Western Armenia (which was under the Zakarian Dynasty's rule) saw a period of an economic and cultural boom. The event played a crucial role in the 13th-century history of the Armenian church, solidifying the Chalcedonians' positions while simultaneously approximating the two denominations.

In the early 13th century, a number of monasteries were estranged from the Armenian Apostolic Church to be handed over to the Chalcedonian Armenians. Among them were Pghindzavank (Akhtala), Kobayr,  Khuchap, Hnevank, Kirants, Srveh, Sedvivank, Bggavor, etc. According to Aleksey Lidov, the region, which formed part of the Georgian Kingdom in different periods of history, remained the stronghold of the Armenian culture. According to The Cambridge History of Christianity, the Chalcedonian Armenian monasteries of Kobayr, Kirants and Pghndzavank (Akhtala, Lori region) performed the translation of texts unavailable in the Armenian language in the 13th century. Anthony Bryer, David Winfield, Dawit Isaak and Selina Ballance refer to Lori as the Chalcedonian-Armenian region of Georgia in the 13th century.

References

Geographic history of Armenia